The 2009–10 Phoenix Coyotes season was the franchise's 38th overall season, its 31st in the National Hockey League (NHL) and its 14th season as the Phoenix Coyotes. After numerous seasons of losing money, the team was placed into bankruptcy and taken over by the NHL. A plan to move the team to Hamilton, Ontario, was rejected by the bankruptcy court.

Bankruptcy

Coyotes owner Jerry Moyes put the team into Chapter 11 bankruptcy during the off-season, and proposed to the court that an offer by Canadian Jim Balsillie for over $200 million be accepted and the team moved to Hamilton, Ontario. The NHL challenged the plan in court and court hearings were held over the summer in Arizona Court. Two other prospective buyers were recruited by the NHL to submit bids to purchase the team but neither made any formal offers to the bankruptcy court. The NHL was the only other group that made a formal offer in court. At first, neither offer had been accepted by the court; Balsillie's bid was rejected outright by the court, stating that it recognized the right of the league to control ownership and relocation, and not allow bankruptcy to be used as a back door. The NHL's bid was rejected because it did not propose to pay Moyes or Wayne Gretzky any money owed. The NHL and Moyes later came to an agreement and the transfer to the NHL was accepted by the court.

After the sale of the team to the NHL, the team fell under the supervision of the NHL. The team arranged a budget under the NHL ownership while allowing general manager Don Maloney to run the club. At the trade deadline, Maloney was the most active trader, making seven trades to improve his club for the playoffs. This was reported to have caused complaints to NHL Commissioner Gary Bettman from other general managers.

Fan attendance was a disappointment for the club, however, and figures supplied to the bankruptcy court showed that the club lost $5 million for the month of October alone. The club finished with the league's worst attendance, and in a lawsuit filed by the NHL against Moyes, the NHL estimated that the team would lose $20 million for the season.

Off-season 
In the Entry Draft, the Coyotes picked Oliver Ekman-Larsson with their first-round pick, sixth overall. Otherwise, it was a quiet off-season.

The team signed numerous NHL veteran free agents in the off-season, including Vernon Fiddler, Jason LaBarbera, Adrian Aucoin, Taylor Pyatt, Ryan Hollweg and Robert Lang. This represented a change in direction from previous seasons, which emphasized the development of young prospects.

Preseason 
Head coach Gretzky resigned during the training camp period. Neither Balsillie nor the NHL proposed to retain Gretzky on his $8 million contract. On September 24, the Coyotes hired Dave Tippett as their new head coach after Gretzky had resigned earlier the same day.

Regular season 
Despite all the uncertainty surrounding the team, the Coyotes started well, compiling a 9–4–0 record in October.

The regular season was, statistically speaking, the best in the franchise's 38-year history.  The team finished with 107 points, the most the team has ever earned in any season, NHL or WHA.

On March 13, the Coyotes won their 41st regular season game over the Carolina Hurricanes, breaking the Coyotes previous one-season record for wins (40 in 2001–02). On March 18, the Coyotes beat the Vancouver Canucks 4–3 in a shootout to record the 44th win of the season, setting a new franchise record for wins as an NHL team with 44. The franchise's previous NHL record was 43 wins, by the Winnipeg Jets.  On March 27, the Coyotes defeated the Dallas Stars 3–2 in a shootout to notch their 97th point for the season, passing the 1984–85 Jets for the highest point total in the NHL portion of franchise history.  On March 27, the Coyotes defeated the Colorado Avalanche 6–2 to surpass the 100-point mark for the first time ever as an NHL team, and for the first time since 1977–78 in the WHA.

Division standings

Conference standings

Game log 

Source Phoenix Coyotes.

Playoffs

On March 27, 2010, the Coyotes clinched a playoff spot, their first playoff spot since the 2001–02 season, and in the process, reached the 100-point mark for the first time in franchise history. Their first-round opponent in the Stanley Cup playoffs was the Detroit Red Wings. As the fourth seed in the West, the Coyotes had home ice advantage in a playoff series for the first time since 1998-1999, when they lost to the St. Louis Blues in seven games.

Coyotes vs. Red Wings
The teams split their season series this year, with both Coyote victories coming in overtime, including a 5–4 road victory on January 26 in Detroit. The Coyotes were down 4–2 with less than two minutes to play in regulation and scored two goals with an extra attacker, one by defenseman Keith Yandle via a one-timer from the point which he didn't get much wood on and the second by defenseman Ed Jovanovski, who took a pass from captain Shane Doan from behind the net and going five-hole on Jimmy Howard. In overtime, Doan eventually scored the winning goal after taking a kick-pass from center Matthew Lombardi and taking his time to put the puck past Howard and giving the Coyotes an improbable 5–4 come-from-behind victory and setting the tone for the rest of Phoenix's season.

The Coyotes organization has planned their playoff tradition of a WhiteOut, which dates back to the franchise's days in Winnipeg. The last WhiteOut that the organization attempted was early in the season, a 2–0 loss to the visiting Columbus Blue Jackets on October 10.

On April 12, an article on Yahoo! Sports surfaced revealing that the Coyotes must counter the Red Wings tradition of throwing octopus onto the ice by having Phoenix fans throw rubber or plastic snakes onto the surface. The article's source was a Coyotes blog entitled "Five For Howling," authored by longtime fan Travis Hair. The movement gained wide popularity by way of Twitter with the hashtag of #throwthesnake. However, when Hair informed the organization of the idea, the front office rejected the plan, citing league rules of delay of game penalties and arena rules of nothing entering the playing area.

Many experts picked the Red Wings to win the series because of their torrid pace of play since the Olympic break and the play of rookie goaltender and Calder Memorial Trophy candidate Jimmy Howard. However, there are members of the media who favored the Coyotes in the series, citing their home-ice advantage and regular season home record, Tippett's coaching, the play of Vezina Trophy and Hart Memorial Trophy candidate Ilya Bryzgalov, and the additions of wingers Wojtek Wolski and Lee Stempniak, who have provided an offensive punch to a team built on defense.

The series has also been selected by many analysts to be the most intriguing out of all the first-round series due to the contrast in styles of Detroit's high-octane offense and Phoenix's suffocating defense. The experience of Detroit's squad matched up with the veteran, but playoff-inexperienced Phoenix club also plays a factor.

On April 14, the Coyotes won the first game of the best-of-seven series by a score of 3–2. Tomas Holmstrom and Nicklas Lidstrom scored for the Red Wings while Phoenix's three goals came via the power play, which was a rare occurrence for a team that had been struggling with the man-advantage all season. Defenseman Keith Yandle scored the first goal, trade deadline acquisition Wojtek Wolski tallied one early in the second, and defenseman Derek Morris fired home the eventual game winner in the third.

Two days later, on April 16, the Red Wings evened up the series at 1–1 behind a strong game from Henrik Zetterberg who recorded a hat trick to propel Detroit to a 7–4 win. The Coyotes struck first off a tip-in from Keith Yandle but the Wings got back into it. The second period was an eventful one, with the teams combining for five goals in a span of 3:58. However, Detroit added four goals in the third period, including the eventual game winner by Zetterberg, to take home the win.

In Detroit for the third game, the Coyotes responded from their disappointing second game by scoring first. With just 29 seconds elapsed in the first period, defenseman Sami Lepisto followed up a rebound given up by Jimmy Howard off a shot Petr Prucha and fired it into the net. Early in the second period, the Phoenix captain and on ice inspiration, Shane Doan was injured after tripping over Jimmy Howard in the goal crease and crashing heavily into the boards. It would later be revealed that Doan suffered a grade 3 shoulder separation, and he would not play the rest of the series. The Red Wings would tie the game up at 1 off a shot by Valtteri Filppula that snuck past Ilya Bryzgalov on the short side and crossed the goal line just enough. Later, with less than a minute in the second period, Wojtek Wolski broke the tie, punching a rebound in off a shot by Matthew Lombardi to give the Coyotes a 2–1 lead heading into the third. In the third period, Prucha scored for Phoenix off a pass from Radim Vrbata. Vrbata took a pass from Prucha off the boards and then fed a pass to Prucha between two defenders, and then tucked it past Howard. The Wings would get back into it however off of a goal by Johan Franzen that also snuck past Bryzgalov's short side, making the game 3–2. Later in the third, Vrbata would propel the puck past Howard from the left faceoff circle, giving the Coyotes a 4–2 lead, which would be the final score.

In the fourth game, on April 20, the game was scoreless until Henrik Zetterberg scored on the power play by deflecting a shot from Niklas Kronwall, upwards into the net. Pavel Datsyuk scored 15:53 minutes in on a one-timer from Johan Franzen (with captain Nicklas Lidstrom getting an assist as well). Henrik Zetterberg had the final goal of the game at 16:18 minutes played in the third, with assists from Todd Bertuzzi and Brad Stuart. Jimmy Howard was the first star of the game, producing 29 saves and a shutout.

Headed back to Phoenix for the fifth game on April 23, the coyotes were 0 for 14 on the power play after going 3 for 3 in game one. The Phoenix power play would be held scoreless once again, going 0 for 5. The scoring started for Detroit when Drew Miller scored a wrap around goal on Ilya Bryzgalov at 17:04 of the first period. Ed Jovanovski would tie the score 1–1 at 9:45 in the second period when an Adrian Aucoin shot from the point bounced off of Jimmy Howard's right pad and lay just outside the crease when Jovanowski spun around and slipped the puck in short side. The game remained tied until 11:09 of the third when a Nicklas Lidstrom shot from the point hit Tomas Holmstrom in front of the net while he was skating through the crease behind Bryzgalov, the puck got tangled up in Holmstrom's equipment until he stopped in the crease, behind Bryzgalov and the puck fell to the ice. Holmstrom shot the puck into the empty net as no one but Holmstrom could locate the puck. 70 seconds later, Pavel Datsyuk scored another goal on the backhand at 12:19 and Henrik Zetterberg added an empty net goal at 19:04.

On April 25, in game six in Detroit, Phoenix's power play had gone 0 for 19 after an amazing start in game one. The game didn't start out well for Phoenix when they took three penalties in the first 5 minutes of the game, but Bryzgalov came up huge on the penalty kill, blanking the Red Wings on three chances including a short 5 on 3 power play and then Lauri Korpikoski scored a shorthanded goal at 4:10 of the first period and momentum in hand, Phoenix never looked back. Phoenix took over in the second period when Mathieu Schneider scored a power play goal, Radim Vrbata added another power play goal and Wojtek Wolski tipped in an even strength goal. Taylor Pyatt added another power play goal in the third Brad Stuart and Darren Helm scored for Detroit.

After an impressive 5–2 game 6 win where Phoenix excelled on the penalty kill and the power play and controlled much of the play, people were expecting more of the same from Phoenix in game seven at home. However it was just the opposite. Detroit came out and controlled the play from the puck drop, outshooting Phoenix 17–6 in the first  period and 50–33 in the game. Thanks to an impressive display by Ilya Bryzgalov the score remained tied 0–0 at the end of the first. But Detroit would not let up, they continued dominating in the second and finally perforated Bryzgalov at 2:01 of the second on the power play when a scramble in front of the net let loose a puck in the slot that Pavel Datsyuk shot in between Bryzgalov's legs. 1:41 seconds later, Datsyuk would score again on a breakaway that Henrik Zetterberg helped set up with a precise pass through the neutral zone during a four-on-four sequence. Vernon Fiddler would cut the Detroit lead in half when he shot a puck instantly off the face off that caught Jimmy Howard by surprise, but Detroit's Nicklas Lidstrom restored the two-goal lead when he scored a power play goal with a slap shot. The back-breaking point for the Coyotes came at the end of the second period when Phoenix was rewarded with a 1:12 5 on 3 power play with the score 3–1. Detroit killed off the disadvantage masterfully with defenseman Nicklas Kronwall blocking multiple shots and Jimmy Howard making timely saves, at the end of the disadvantage they Coyotes defenseman Keith Yandle missed a Lee Stempniak pass back to the point which bounced off the boards into the neutral zone just as Detroit player, Brad Stuart was coming out of the penalty box, Stuart picked up the puck and scored on the break away, roofing the puck over Bryzgalov's right shoulder. Yandle clearly showed signs of frustration and a general lack of class when he intentionally tripped Henrik Zetterberg as he was skating behind the net to celebrate the goal with Stuart, sending Zetterberg crashing heavily into the end boards, Zetterberg was not injured on the play and Yandle escaped punishment. Todd Bertuzzi would add another goal in the third, scoring on the rebound of a Valtteri Filppula shot and Lidstrom added another power play goal when he scored on a wrist shot from the circle. At the end of the game, after the handshake line the Phoenix fans gave the team a standing ovation and the players saluted the fans by raising their sticks at center ice, a tradition that almost all NHL teams participate in.

Key:  Win  Loss

Player statistics

Skaters

Goaltenders

†Denotes player spent time with another team before joining Coyotes. Stats reflect time with the Coyotes only.
‡Traded mid-season.
Bold/italics denotes franchise record.

Awards and records

Records

Milestones

Awards

Transactions 

The Coyotes have been involved in the following transactions during the 2009–10 season.

Trades 

|}

Free agents acquired

Free agents lost

Claimed via waivers

Lost via waivers

Player signings

Draft picks 

Phoenix's picks at the 2009 NHL Entry Draft in Montreal, Quebec.

See also 
 2009–10 NHL season

Farm teams 
San Antonio Rampage
The San Antonio Rampage are the Coyotes American Hockey League affiliate in 2009–10.

Arizona Sundogs
The Arizona Sundogs were the Coyotes affiliate in the CHL but are no longer affiliated.

References 

Arizona Coyotes seasons
P
P